Hino Motors, Ltd., commonly known as Hino, is a Japanese manufacturer of commercial vehicles and diesel engines (including those for trucks, buses and other vehicles) headquartered in Hino, Tokyo. The company was established in 1942 as a corporate spin-off from previous manufacturers.

Hino Motors is a large constituent of the Nikkei 225 on the Tokyo Stock Exchange.  It is a subsidiary of Toyota Motor Corporation and one of 16 major companies of the Toyota Group.

History
The company traces its roots back to the founding of Tokyo Gas Industry Company in 1910.  In 1910, Chiyoda Gas Company was established and competed fiercely against incumbent Tokyo Gas Company for gas lighting users.  Tokyo Gas Industry was a parts supplier for Chiyoda Gas but it was defeated and merged into Tokyo Gas in 1912. Having lost its largest client, Tokyo Gas Industry Co. broadened its product line including electronic parts, and renamed itself as Tokyo Gas and Electric Industry (東京瓦斯電気工業), TG&E, and was often abbreviated as Gasuden.  It produced its first motor vehicle in 1917, the Model TGE "A-Type" truck.  In 1937, TG&E merged its automobile division with that of Automobile Industry Co., Ltd. and Kyodo Kokusan K.K., to form Tokyo Automobile Industry Co., Ltd., with TG&E as a shareholder. Four years later, the company changed its name to Diesel Motor Industry Co., Ltd., which would eventually become Isuzu.

The following year (1942), the new entity of Hino Heavy Industry Co., Ltd. spun itself out from Diesel Motor Industry Co., Ltd., and the Hino name was born. During World War II, Hino manufactured Type 1 Ho-Ha half-track and Type 1 Ho-Ki armored personnel carrier for the Imperial Japanese Army. Following treaties signed at the end of World War II, the company had to stop producing large diesel engines for marine applications, so the company dropped the "Heavy" from its name and formally concentrated on the heavy-duty trailer-truck, buses and diesel engines markets, as Hino Industry Co., Ltd.  The company took its name from the location of its headquarters in  within Tokyo prefecture.

To sharpen its marketing focus to customers, in 1948, the company added the name "Diesel" to become Hino Diesel Industry Co., Ltd. In 1950 the heavy-duty TH10 was introduced, equipped with the all-new 7-liter DS10 diesel engine. An eight-tonner, this was considerably larger than existing Japanese trucks which had rarely been built for more than  payload.

In 1953, Hino entered the private car market, by manufacturing Renaults under licence, and in 1961 it started building its own Contessa 900 sedan with an 893cc rear-mounted engine, and a pickup truck called the Hino Briska with the Contessa engine slightly enlarged and installed in the front with rear wheel drive.  The Italian stylist Giovanni Michelotti redesigned the Contessa line in 1964 with a 1300 cc rear-mounted engine.  Fed by two SU type carburettors, this developed 60 hp (44 kW) in the sedan and 70 hp (51 kW) in the coupé version.  However, Hino ceased private car production very quickly in 1967 following a strategic alliance with Toyota in 1965.

In 1963, the Hamura factory began operations, and focused entirely on commercial truck and bus manufacture.

Hino Trucks have also been assembled in Norway (1977–85), Portugal and Canada.

Hino became a wholly owned subsidiary of Toyota Motor Corporation in 2001.

In 2018, Hino and Volkswagen Truck and Bus (later renamed Traton) announced a wide-ranging strategic partnership for activities including procurement, technologies and logistics. In November 2019, they established a procurement joint venture called Hino and Traton Global Procurement, with 51% of it owned by Traton and 49% by Hino.

In March 2021, Hino, its parent Toyota,  and Isuzu announced the creation of a strategic partnership between the three companies. Toyota acquired a 4.6% stake in Isuzu while the latter plans to acquire Toyota shares for an equivalent value. The three companies said they would form a new joint venture by April called Commercial Japan Partnership Technologies Corporation with the aim of developing fuel cell and electric light trucks. Toyota would own an 80% stake in the venture while Hino and Isuzu would own 10% each. In August 2022, after Toyota published the findings of a self-commissioned investigation highlighting that Hino Motors falsified emissions data on some engines going back to at least October 2003, Toyota and Isuzu "expelled" Hino from their partnership. The Hino stake would be given to Toyota.

Canada 
Hino has been marketing trucks in Canada since the 1970s. Hino Motors Canada Ltd., is the exclusive distributor of Hino products in Canada, and is part of the Toyota Group of Companies, with head office and Parts Distribution Centre in Mississauga, Ontario. In May 2006, Hino opened a new  assembly plant in Woodstock, Ontario, employing at first 45 (grown since to more than 70) and with an annual capacity of 2,400 trucks. It began assembly of Class 4 and 5 trucks in 2006 and continued to do so until 2010. Since then, it has been building only Class 6 and 7 trucks.

Colombia 
Hino Motors Manufacturing Colombia (HMMC) is a partnership between the Mitsui group and the Colombia manager for the Hino brand, PRACO-Didacol S.A. The partnership assembles medium and heavy trucks, destined mainly to the export market for the Andinean and Central American countries. The factory was opened on 9 October 2007 in Cota, a municipality near the capital city of Bogotá. From this facility, the FCJ and Hino Dutro (300, 500 and 900 series) trucks are assembled. The Mitsui-Keiretsu is the principal shareholder and owner of this factory. The plant produced the 1000th unit in July 2009. The 20,000th truck was finished on 14 May 2014.

Indonesia 
PT. Hino Motors Manufacturing Indonesia (HMMI) is strategic production base for ASEAN region. HMMI is in partnership between the Hino Motors, Ltd and PT. Indomobil Sukses Internasional, Tbk. The partnership assembles medium, heavy duty trucks, mainly for ASEAN market. The factory was opened in April 2003, evolving from PT. Hino Indonesia Manufacturing which was opened in October 1982.  The factory is located on Purwakarta, West Java. Its sister company PT. Hino Motors Sales Indonesia (HMSI) is formed April 2003. Currently there are 41 dealerships and more than 100 branches, around the archipelago.

Ireland
Hino Trucks have been assembled in The Republic of Ireland since 1968 by J Harris on the Naas/Nangor Roads, Dublin.

Israel 
Hino Motors signed a 10-year assembly agreement with Kaiser-Illin Industries of Haifa, Israel, in 1963. Assembly of the Contessa 900 started in 1964. Later, Briska 900 and 1300 and the Contessa 1300 sedan were assembled in Haifa as well. The Contessa was even used as a police car in Israel. During the years 1964–1965, Israel was Hino's second most important market for its Contessas. Israel exports amounted to ~10% of total Contessa production. After it was purchased by Toyota, the contract was terminated and the last Israeli Contessas rolled off the assembly line in March 1968. In total, over 8,000 Hino Contessa and Briska were assembled in Israel.

Mexico 
In mid 2008, Hino Motors was said to be building a new truck assembly facility in Guanajuato, Mexico, serving international deliveries. The facility was reportedly built in an 80:20 partnership with Japanese trading firm Mitsui, opening in 2009 and with a production capacity for 1,200 of the Hino 500 series trucks per year.

Pakistan 
Hinopak Motors was formed in 1985 by a diverse group of sponsors. These included Hino Motors Limited, Toyota Tsusho Corporation, Al-Futtaim Group and PACO. In 1998, Hino Motors, and Toyota Tsusho Corporation obtained majority shareholding in the company after disinvestments by the other two founding sponsors.

Hinopak Motors manufactures and markets diesel trucks and buses in Pakistan. Hinopak Motors has gained 70% market share making it the largest manufacturer in medium and heavy-duty truck and bus industry in Pakistan. Hinopak Motors Head Office is located in S.I.T.E Industrial Area, Karachi, Sindh, Pakistan.

Philippines 
In 1975, Hino has entered the Philippine market, and creating  Pilipinas Hino, Inc. It was originally established for the manufacturing of buses and, later, trucks. In the 1970s, Hino had initially shipped vehicles to the country from Japan, before the creation of PHI.

In 2015, Pilipinas Hino, Inc. announced name its change to  Hino Motors Philippines Corporation.

Russia 
In 2017, Hino Motors announced that it was going to open its first factory in Russia. The factory will begin producing trucks in 2019 and will have the capacity to produce 3,000 yearly.

Thailand
Thai Hino Industry Co., Ltd. was established in 1964, with an assembly plant in Samrong. A second plant was established in Bang Phli in 1982. In 1999 the sales arm (Thai Hino Motor Sales Ltd.) and the manufacturing arm were merged, becoming Hino Motors (Thailand) Ltd. The company was split again in 2003, becoming Hino Motors Manufacturing (Thailand) Ltd. and Hino Motors Sales (Thailand) Ltd. A third plant was opened the following year, at Amatanakorn industrial park in Bang Pakong District (a vehicle assembly plant).

 Hino 300 Innovator light duty trucks for small business
 Hino 500 Dominator medium duty trucks for Agriculture business
 Hino 500 Victor heavy duty trucks for transportation business
 Hino 700 Splendor heavy duty trucks for international transportation business

United States 
In the United States, Hino has operated since 1984.  Hino Motors Manufacturing U.S.A., Inc. assembles medium-duty trucks at its Williamstown, West Virginia, plant. They opened a second plant in Mineral Wells, West Virginia in late 2018.  Its manufacturing facilities in Ontario, California, and Marion, Arkansas, produce axles, knuckles, and suspension components for Toyota's Tacoma, Tundra, and Sequoia models. Hino's Parts Distribution Center in Mira Loma, California, supplies Latin American and Caribbean distributors with genuine Hino service parts. The  assembly plant in Williamstown, West Virginia, assembles Class 6-7 Hino trucks at an annual capacity of 10,000 units. The plant was opened in November 2007 and employs about 200.

The plant in Long Beach, California, where Hino's US-based medium duty truck production had begun in 2004, was closed in 2007 and its production was transferred to the West Virginia facility. Production in West Virginia began with Class 4-7 trucks but the Class 4-5 products were dropped after 2010 model year and the plant now focuses on Class 6-7 products.
Opened in 2016, Hino operates a distribution center in Gahanna Ohio.

Trucks and buses

Trucks
 Hino TH-series: a heavy duty bonneted truck, sold from 1950 until discontinued in favor of cab-over trucks in 1968.
 Ford N Series trucks (sold 1980–1998 in Oceania) These were badge-engineered Hino Ranger models.
 Profia (previously Super Dolphin Profia), sold as Hino 700 for export: heavy duty truck
 Bonneted medium truck (for North America): coded Hino 600.
 Dutro: light truck, sold as Hino 300 (hybrid version available) 
 Ranger 2 FA, FB, FC: light trucks replaced by Dutro.
 Ranger: also sold as Hino 500, medium to heavy truck
 The Ranger KL was first introduced in 1969
 The 2nd generation was launched in 1980
 The 3rd generation of 1989 is called Rising Ranger and Cruising Ranger.
 The latest 4th generation (Ranger Pro) came in 2002 (hybrid version available)
 The first generation Ranger KL spawned into KM, KR, and other variants in Australia.
 155 Class 4: light duty truck
 XL: class 7/8 heavy trucks for the US and Canada

Hino also sold the European truck Scania R 420 in Japan, in an agreement with the Swedish brand which was discontinued in 2011.

United States and Canada 

USA and Canada only conventional/bonneted trucks Hino 600:
 145 Class 4: medium duty truck (discontinued)
 165 Class 4: medium duty truck (discontinued)
 185 Class 5: medium duty truck (discontinued)
 238 Class 6: medium duty truck
 258 Class 6: medium duty truck
 268 Class 6: medium duty truck
 338 Class 7: heavy duty truck
 358 Class 7: heavy duty truck

Buses
 Poncho: Non-step light bus
 Liesse & Liesse II: light bus
 The Liesse II is a rebadged Toyota Coaster.
 Blue Ribbon & Blue Ribbon II: city bus
 The Blue Ribbon II is a rebadged Isuzu Erga.
 Rainbow & Rainbow II: medium bus
 The Rainbow II is a rebadged Isuzu Erga Mio.
 Melpha: medium bus
 S'elega: luxury bus
 The new model is offered as High Decker and Super High Decker.
 Front-engine chassis (FB, FC, GB, XZU): light bus
 Front-engine chassis (AK, FF, FG): big bus
 Mid-engine chassis (BG, BX, BT, CG, CM): big bus
 Rear-engine chassis (RC, RF, RG, RM, RK, RU, RV, RN, HT): big bus
 Front-engine Type C school bus chassis (Hino 338): Used in the production of the Starcraft Guardian

Philippines
 RC421(ER200)
 RF821(EK100)
 RM2KSS (K13D)
 RK3HS (H07D)
 RK1JMT (J08C-TK)
 RK1JST (J08C-TK)
 RM2PSS (P11C-TH)
 RU2PSS (P11C-TE)
 RK8JMUA (J08E-UB)
 RK8JSUA (J08E-UB)
 RN8J (J08E-UB)
 FB2W
 FB4J
 FC3J
 FC9JL7A (J05E-TY)
 FF3H (H06D)
 AK174 (EH700)
 AK176 (EH700)
 FG8JPSB (J08E-UG)
 FG1JPUB (J08C-F)
 FG1JPUZ (J08C-TT)
 FG8JPUB (J08E-UG)
 FG8JP7A (J08E-WF)
 HT223A (M10U)
 HT225A (M10U)

Fiji
AM100
 AC140  /W06D
 AB115A /W04D
 AK176K /EH700
 AK3HRK /H07D
 AK1JRK /J08C
 AK8JRK /J08E
 BX341  /EH700
 BY320  /EB300/ EM100
 BX321  /EH300
 RJ172A /EH700
 RR172A /EH700

Pakistan

 Roadliner Bullet
 Roadliner Supreme
 Rapidliner Deluxe
 Senator Pride
 Hino Splendor
 Citibus
 Urban Bus
 CNG Bus
 Citiliner Classic
 All Liner

Cuba
One small model for military and workers transportation (name of the model still unknown).
 RC 1971: Urbans (RC 300), Regulars (RC 300AP), Specials (RC 200P for long run travels with air condition)
 RV 850P 1977 and 1983 (400 buses)
 RU 1987 (one bus)
 NE 1977 (trucks)
 NF 1983 (trucks)
Others small trucks for food transportation.

Malaysia

 RE100
 BX300
 AK174K
 AK176K/EH700
 AK1JRKA/J08C
 AK1JSKA
 AK3HRKA/H07D 
 RK1JSKA/J08C
 RK1MSLL/EM100
 RK1JSLL/J08C
 RM1ESKU/E13C
 RM2KSKA/K13D
 RM1KSKU
 RK8JSKA/J08E
 RN8JSKA/J08E
 RN8JSNA/J08E
 RN8JSPA/J08E

Cars

 Hino Renault 4CV, built under license
 Contessa, passenger car built in 1960s
 Toyota FJ Cruiser, SUV built for Toyota, 2006-2016

Affiliates/subsidiaries
 Hino Motors Canada, Ltd.—see Toyota Canada
 Hino Motors Sales U.S.A.
 Hino Motors Manufacturing Colombia
 Harris Hino, Ireland
 Hinopak Motors, Pakistan
 Hino Motors Philippines Corporation (Pilipinas Hino, Inc.)
 Samco (Vietnam)
 Indomobil (Indonesia)
 Hino Motors Manufacturing USA
 Hino Motors Manufacturing (Thailand) Ltd.
 Hino Motors Sales (Thailand) Co., Ltd.
 Hino Motors Vietnam

Motorsport

"Team Samurai" entered a Contessa in the Trans Am Series in 1966 at the race at Riverside International Raceway. After being retired due to a collision, the team withdrew from the series.

Hino has competed in the Dakar Rally since 1991 with a Ranger FT 4WD truck driven by the Japanese rally driver, Yoshimasa Sugawara. Hino has always finished in the Top 10 in the Camion Category, and 1-2-3 overall in the 1997 event.

Aircraft
The Tokyo Gas & Electrical Industry Co. Ltd. (a.k.a. Gasuden) were responsible for the production of several aircraft types in the 1930s as listed below: (Tokyo Gasu Denki Kogyo KK - Tokyo Gas & Electrical Industry Co. Ltd.)
 Gasuden KR-1 Small Passenger Transport
 Gasuden KR-2 Small Passenger Transport
 Gasuden Model 1 Trainer
 Gasuden Model 2 Trainer
 Gasuden Model 3 Trainer
 Gasuden Koken Long-range Research aircraft
 Gasuden TR-1 Medium Passenger Transport
 Gasuden TR-2 Medium Passenger Transport

See also 

 Daihatsu

References

External links

 

Vehicle manufacturing companies established in 1942
Japanese companies established in 1942
Automotive companies based in Tokyo
Bus manufacturers of Japan
Companies listed on the Tokyo Stock Exchange
Defense companies of Japan
Diesel engine manufacturers
Electric vehicle manufacturers of Japan
Engine manufacturers of Japan
Hybrid electric bus manufacturers
Manufacturing companies based in Tokyo
Military vehicle manufacturers
Toyota Group
Toyota subsidiaries
Truck manufacturers of Japan